There are several types of protected areas of the Czech Republic. The main form of landscape protection is delimitation of special protected areas. All the types of protected areas are determined by law.

Special protected areas
There are six types of special protected areas distinguished by their size and importance. The types of large-scale protected areas are national park and protected landscape area; the types of small-scale protected areas are national nature reserve, nature reserve, national nature monument, and nature monument.

National park
National park (abbreviated as NP) are defined as a large areas with a typical relief and geological structure and a predominant occurrence of natural or man-made ecosystems, unique and significant on a national or international scale in terms of ecology, science, education or awareness. They are established by the Czech Government. As of 2021 there are 4 national parks in the Czech Republic:

Protected landscape area

They are established by the Czech Government. As of 2021 there were 26 protected landscape areas in the Czech Republic:

National nature reserve
National nature reserve (abbreviated NPR) is a smaller area of exceptional nature value, where a typical relief of typical geological composition is combined with ecosystems important on an international or national level. They are established by the Czech Ministry of Environment.

Nature reserve
Nature reserve (abbreviated PR) is a smaller area with concentrated nature features and ecosystems typical for a given geographical region. They are established by the appropriate Regional Government or Management of a National Park or Landscape Protected Area.

National nature monument
National Nature monument (abbreviated as NPP) is a nature formation of a smaller area, usually geological or geomorphological formation, mineral or fossil collection locality or a habitat of endangered plants or animals in parts of ecosystems with a local environmental, scientific or esthetic importance.  They are established by the Czech Ministry of Environment.

Nature monument

Nature Monument (abbreviated as PP) is a nature formation of a smaller area, usually geological or geomorphological formation, mineral or fossil collection locality or a habitat of endangered plants or animals in parts of ecosystems with an international or national environmental, scientific or esthetic importance. They are established by the appropriate Regional Government or Management of a national park or protected landscape area.

Other forms of landscape protection

Nature park

Nature park is usually a large area serving the protection of a landscape against activities that could decrease its natural and esthetic value. They can be established by any State Environment Protection body.

Memorable tree, group of trees or alley
Memorable tree, group of trees or alley. They can be established by any State Environment Protection body.

Notable landscape feature
Notable landscape feature is usually a natural, cultural or historical feature typical for a given locality or region. They can be established by any State Environment Protection body.

Specially protected species of plants and animals
Specially protected species of plants and animals are those species or subspecies which are very rare, generally endangered, scientifically or culturally important. They are listed in a Czech Ministry of Environment regulation. As of 2003, there are 477 plant species, 27 mushroom species and 191 animals on the list.

References

External links

Further reading

 
Geography of the Czech Republic